Balian or Balyan may refer to:

People
Balian of Ibelin (disambiguation), a name shared by several members of the Ibelin family from the crusader kingdoms of Jerusalem and Cyprus
Balian Buschbaum (born 1980), German pole vaulter
Roger Balian, 20th-century French physicist; co-creator of the Balian–Low theorem
Balyan family, Ottoman Armenian family of court architects, 18th–19th century

Southeast Asia
Balian, another term for the babaylan shamans of the Philippines
 Balian, Balinese language term for a traditional healer

Other uses
Balian–Low theorem

House of Ibelin